Duchemin is a French surname meaning "of the path". Notable people with the surname include:

Catherine Duchemin (1630—1698), French painter
Theresa Maxis Duchemin (1810—1892), pioneering Black religious sister
Emmanuel Duchemin (born 1979), French footballer
 Angélique Duchemin (1991-2017), boxer

French-language surnames